Armenia originally planned to participate in the Eurovision Song Contest 2020 with the song "Chains on You" written by Athena Manoukian and DJ Paco. The song was performed by Athena Manoukian. The Armenian entry for the 2020 contest in Rotterdam, Netherlands was selected through the national final , organised by the Armenian broadcaster Public Television of Armenia (AMPTV). The national final took place on 15 February 2020 where twelve entries competed. "Chains on You" performed by Athena Manoukian was selected as the winner following the combination of votes from an international jury, an Armenian jury and a public televote.

Armenia was drawn to compete in the second semi-final of the Eurovision Song Contest which took place on 14 May 2020. However, the contest was cancelled due to the COVID-19 pandemic.

Background 

Prior to the 2020 Contest, Armenia had participated in the Eurovision Song Contest thirteen times since its first entry in 2006. Its highest placing in the contest, to this point, has been fourth place, which the nation achieved on two occasions: in 2008 with the song "" performed by Sirusho and in 2014 with the song "Not Alone" performed by Aram Mp3. Armenia had, to this point, failed to qualify to the final on three occasions, in 2011, 2018 and 2019, the latter with the song "Walking Out" performed by Srbuk. The nation briefly withdrew from the contest in 2012 due to long-standing tensions with then host country Azerbaijan.

The Armenian national broadcaster, Public Television of Armenia (AMPTV), broadcasts the event within Armenia and organises the selection process for the nation's entry. AMPTV confirmed their intentions to participate at the 2020 Eurovision Song Contest on 29 October 2019. Armenia has used various methods to select the Armenian entry in the past, such as internal selections and a live televised national final to choose the performer, song or both to compete at Eurovision. Between 2014 and 2016, the broadcaster internally selected both the artist and the song, while the national final  was organized in 2017 and 2018. The broadcaster opted to internally select the 2019 Armenian entry, however, AMPTV announced on 5 November 2019 that  would select the Armenian entry for the 2020 contest.

Before Eurovision

Depi Evratesil 2020 
 ("Towards Eurovision 2020") was the third edition of the national final  and selected the Armenian entry for the Eurovision Song Contest 2020. The competition took place on 15 February 2020 at the AMPTV studios in Yerevan, hosted by Mane Grigoryan and Arman Margaryan. Twelve entries competed and the winner was determined by the combination of votes from international and Armenian jury panels and a public vote. The show was broadcast on Armenia 1 as well as online via the broadcaster's website 1tv.am.

Competing entries 
On 5 November 2019, AMPTV announced an online submission period with a deadline of 31 December 2019. Artists were required to be aged at least 16 and are of Armenian citizenship or heritage, and were also required to submit a cover version of another song along with their entry submission. Songwriters worldwide were able to submit songs. The broadcaster received 53 entries at the closing of the deadline. A nine-member jury panel selected twelve entries to proceed to the national final, which were announced on 5 February 2020. The selection jury consisted of Naira Gurjinyan, Anita Hakhverdyan, Lilia Nikoyan, Ruben Babayan, Vardan Hakobyan, Tigran Danielyan, David Tserunyan, Karen Tataryan and Anush Ter-Ghukasyan. Among the competing artists was Vladimir Arzumanyan who won the Junior Eurovision Song Contest 2010 for Armenia, and Tokionine, who co-wrote the Armenian entry in 2019.

Final 
The final took place on 15 February 2020. Twelve entries competed and the winner, "Chains on You" performed by Athena Manoukian, was selected by the combination of votes from a five-member international jury (1/3), a five-member Armenian jury (1/3) and a public vote (1/3). In addition to the performances of the competing entries, the interval acts featured Armenian 2016 Eurovision entrant Iveta Mukuchyan with "Rich Bitch" and "LoveWave", and Armenian 2019 Junior Eurovision entrant Karina Ignatyan with "Colours of Your Dream".

Preparation 
Production changes for the song were made by Artem Valter, while the video was directed by Arthur Manukyan and featured fashion designs by Mary Stepanyan and Aram Nikolyan. The video was released via the official Eurovision Song Contest's YouTube channel on 13 March 2020.

At Eurovision 
According to Eurovision rules, all nations with the exceptions of the host country and the "Big Five" (France, Germany, Italy, Spain and the United Kingdom) are required to qualify from one of two semi-finals in order to compete for the final; the top ten countries from each semi-final progress to the final. The European Broadcasting Union (EBU) split up the competing countries into six different pots based on voting patterns from previous contests, with countries with favourable voting histories put into the same pot. On 28 January 2020, a special allocation draw was held which placed each country into one of the two semi-finals, as well as which half of the show they would perform in. Estonia was placed into the second semi-final, to be held on 14 May 2020, and was scheduled to perform in the second half of the show. However, due to 2019-20 pandemic of Coronavirus, the contest was cancelled.

During the Eurovision Song Celebration YouTube broadcast in place of the semi-finals, it was revealed that Armenia was set to perform in position 14, following the entry from Finland and before the entry from Portugal.

References

2020
Countries in the Eurovision Song Contest 2020
Eurovision